Hot Snap (foaled 29 March 2010) is a British Thoroughbred racehorse who won the Nell Gwyn Stakes in 2013.

Background
Hot Snap is a chestnut filly with a narrow white blaze bred by her owner, Khalid Abdulla's, Juddmonte Farms Inc. As a daughter of the broodmare Midsummer, she is a half sister to the Breeders' Cup Filly & Mare Turf winner Midday.

Racing career

2012: two-year-old season
Hot Snap made her first appearance in a one-mile maiden race at Kempton Park Racecourse on 19 September. Ridden by Eddie Ahern, she started at odds of 7/1 and won by half a length from Mango Diva.

2013: three-year-old season
On her three-year-old debut, Hot Snap contested the Group Three Nell Gwyn Stakes at Newmarket Racecourse in which she was ridden by Tom Queally. She took the lead approaching the final furlong and won by two and a quarter lengths from the Moyglare Stud Stakes winner Sky Lantern. On 5 May Hot Snap started favourite for the 1000 Guineas over Newmarket's Rowley Mile course but finished ninth of the fifteen runners behind Sky Lantern.

Hot Snap did not run again until the Nassau Stakes at Goodwood Racecourse on 3 August in which she finished third behind the 20/1 outsider Winsili. On 14 September Hot Snap was sent to Ireland for the Group Two Blandford Stakes at the Curragh. She started the 5/4 favourite and finished strongly to take second place, one and three quarter lengths behind the four-year-old Belle de Crecy. On her final appearance of the season, Hot Snap ran in the British Champions Fillies' and Mares' Stakes for which she started the 7/2 co-favourite alongside Talent and Dalkala. She was never in contention and finished fifth behind Seal of Approval.

Pedigree

References

Racehorses bred in the United Kingdom
Racehorses trained in the United Kingdom
2010 racehorse births
Thoroughbred family 9-e